Ashongman is a developing town in the Ga East Municipal district, a district in the Greater Accra Region of Ghana.

Town structure
The town is under the jurisdiction of the Ga East Municipal District and is in the Dome-Kwabenya constituency of the Ghana parliament.

Social Conditions
The town has had numerous issues with the provision of fresh water. The town is divided into three subtowns which are the ashongman estate, Old ashongman and Manna. Almost 70% percent of the roads are bad. The people of Ashongman want the government to construct roads.

References

Populated places in the Greater Accra Region